Louis de Bourbon (1405 – May 1486) was the third son of John I, Duke of Bourbon and Marie, Duchess of Auvergne. He was Count of Montpensier, Clermont-en-Auvergne and Sancerre and Dauphin of Auvergne and was a younger brother of Charles I of Bourbon. He founded the Bourbon-Montpensier branch of the House of Bourbon, which would eventually take over the Duchy in 1505.

Family

In 1428, he married Joanna, Dauphine of Auvergne, daughter and heiress of Beraud III, Dauphin of Auvergne and Count of Clermont-en-Auvergne. After her death in 1436, he retained those titles (his paternal grandmother having been Anne of Auvergne, daughter of Dauphin Beraud II). On 5 February 1442, he married Gabrielle of La Tour (d. 1474), daughter of Bertrand V of La Tour, count of Auvergne and Boulogne. The couple had four children:
 Gilbert, Count of Montpensier (1443–1496)
 John (1445–1485)
 Gabrielle (1447–1516), Countess of Benon, married in 1485 Louis de la Tremoille (d. 1525), Prince of Talmond
 Charlotte (1449–1478), married in 1468 Wolfert van Borselen (d. 1487), Count of Grandpré and Earl of Buchan

He was succeeded by his son Gilbert.

See also
Duke of Bourbon

References

Sources

House of Bourbon-Montpensier
Bourbon-Montpensier, Louis comte de
Bourbon-Montpensier, Louis I de
Bourbon-Montpensier, Louis I de
Dauphins of Auvergne
Montpensier, Louis comte de
Montpensier, Louis comte de